Frederick Wells may refer to:

 Frederick Wells (cricketer, born 1867) (1867–1926), English cricketer
 Frederick Wells (cricketer, born 1796) (1796–1849), English cricketer
 Frederick A. Wells (1857–1926), New York assemblyman
 Frederick W. Wells (fl. 1920s), American civil rights lawyer
 Sir Frederick Wells, 1st Baronet, Lord Mayor of London